Duke of Ficalho (in Portuguese Duque de Ficalho) was a Portuguese title of nobility, granted by a decree issued by Queen Maria II of Portugal on May 14, 1836, to Eugénia de Almeida Portugal, 2nd Countess of Ficalho by marriage.

She was the eldest daughter of the 3rd Marquis of Lavradio.

The Queen elevated Dona Eugénia Almeida Portugal to the title of Marchioness and, in 1836, to Duchess of Ficalho (only during her life), when she became the queen's Maid of Honour (Camareira-Mór), the highest palatine office for a lady.

List of the Dukes of Ficalho 
 Eugénia Maurícia Tomásia Almeida Portugal, 1st. Duchess of Ficalho (1784–1859)

Other Titles
Count of Ficalho, on April 24, 1789, by royal decree of Queen Maria I of Portugal;
Marquis of Ficalho, on April 4, 1833, by royal decree of Queen Maria II of Portugal.

See also
Marquis of Ficalho
Count of Ficalho
Marquis of Lavradio
List of Portuguese Dukedoms

External links
 Genealogy of the Duchess of Ficalho (in Portuguese)

 
Ficalho
Ficalho
1836 establishments in Portugal